An automated storage and retrieval system (ASRS or AS/RS) consists of a variety of computer-controlled systems for automatically placing and retrieving loads from defined storage locations. Automated storage and retrieval systems (AS/RS) are typically used in applications where: 
 There is a very high volume of loads being moved into and out of storage
 Storage density is important because of space constraints
 No value is added in this process (no processing, only storage and transport)
 Accuracy is critical because of potential expensive damages to the load

An AS/RS can be used with standard loads as well as nonstandard loads, meaning that each standard load can fit in a uniformly-sized volume; for example, the film canisters in the image of the Defense Visual Information Center are each stored as part of the contents of the uniformly sized metal boxes, which are shown in the image. Standard loads simplify the handling of a request of an item. In addition, audits of the accuracy of the inventory of contents can be restricted to the contents of an individual metal box, rather than undergoing a top-to-bottom search of the entire facility, for a single item.

They can also be used in  self storage places.Self storage

Overview 

AS/RS systems are designed for automated storage and retrieval of parts and items in manufacturing, distribution, retail, wholesale and institutions. They first originated in the 1960s, initially focusing on heavy pallet loads but with the evolution of the technology the handled loads have become smaller. The systems operate under computerized control, maintaining an inventory of stored items. Retrieval of items is accomplished by specifying the item type and quantity to be retrieved. The computer determines where in the storage area the item can be retrieved from and schedules the retrieval.  It directs the proper automated storage and retrieval machine (SRM) to the location where the item is stored and directs the machine to deposit the item at a location where it is to be picked up.  A system of conveyors and or automated guided vehicles is sometimes part of the AS/RS system. These take loads into and out of the storage area and move them to the manufacturing floor or loading docks. To store items, the pallet or tray is placed at an input station for the system, the information for inventory is entered into a computer terminal and the AS/RS system moves the load to the storage area, determines a suitable location for the item, and stores the load.  As items are stored into or retrieved from the racks, the computer updates its inventory accordingly.

The benefits of an AS/RS system include reduced labor for transporting items into and out of inventory, reduced
inventory levels, more accurate tracking of inventory, and space savings. Items are often stored more densely than in systems where items are stored and retrieved manually.

Within the storage, items can be placed on trays or hang from bars, which are attached to chains/drives in order to move up and down. The equipment required for an AS/RS include a storage & retrieval machine (SRM) that is used for rapid storage and retrieval of material. SRMs are used to move loads vertically or horizontally, and can also move laterally to place objects in the correct storage location.

The trend towards Just In Time production often requires sub-pallet level availability of production inputs, and AS/RS is a much faster way of organizing the storage of smaller items next to production lines.

The Material Handling Institute of America (MHIA), the non-profit trade association for the material handling world, and its members have categorised AS/RS into two primary segments: Fixed Aisle and Carousels/Vertical Lift Modules (VLMs). Both sets of technologies provide automated storage and retrieval for parts and items, but use different technologies. Each technology has its unique set of benefits and disadvantages. Fixed Aisle systems are characteristically larger systems whereas carousels and Vertical Lift Modules are used individually or grouped, but in small to medium-sized applications.

A fixed-aisle AS/R machine (stacker crane) is one of two main designs: single-masted or double masted. Most are supported on a track and ceiling guided at the top by guide rails or channels to ensure accurate vertical alignment, although some are suspended from the ceiling. The 'shuttles' that make up the system travel between fixed storage shelves to deposit or retrieve a requested load (ranging from a single book in a library system to a several ton pallet of goods in a warehouse system). The entire unit moves horizontally within an aisle, while the shuttles are able to elevate up to the necessary height to reach the load, and can extend and retract to store or retrieve loads that are several positions deep in the shelving. A semi-automated system can be achieved by utilizing only specialized shuttles within an existing rack system.

Another AS/RS technology is known as shuttle technology. In this technology the horizontal movement is made by independent shuttles each operating on one level of the rack while a lift at a fixed position within the rack is responsible for the vertical movement. By using two separate machines for these two axes the shuttle technology is able to provide higher throughput rates than stacker cranes.

Storage and Retrieval Machines pick up or drop off loads to the rest of the supporting transportation system at specific stations, where inbound and outbound loads are precisely positioned for proper handling.

In addition, there are several types of Automated Storage & Retrieval Systems (AS/RS) devices called Unit-load AS/RS, Mini-load AS/RS, Mid-Load AS/RS, Vertical Lift Modules (VLMs), Horizontal Carousels and Vertical Carousels. These systems are used either as stand-alone units or in integrated workstations called pods or systems. These units are usually integrated with various types of pick to light systems and use either a microprocessor controller for basic usage or inventory management software. These systems are ideal for increasing space utilization up to 90%, productivity levels by 90%, accuracy to 99.9%+ levels and throughput up to 750 lines per hour/per operator or more depending on the configuration of the system.

Advantages 
An effective automated storage and retrieval system provides several benefits for supply chain management
 An efficient AS/RS system helps companies cut expenses by minimizing the amount of unnecessary parts and products in storage, and improving organization of the contents of a warehouse. Due to automated processes, it also allows for more storage space due to high-density storage, narrower aisles, etc.
Automation reduces labor costs while lowering workforce requirements and increasing safety.
 Modeling and managing the logical representation of the physical storage facilities (e.g. racking, etc.). For example, if certain products are often sold together or are more popular than others, those products can be grouped together or placed near the delivery area to speed up the process of picking, packing and shipping to customers.
 Enabling a seamless link to order processing and logistics management in order to pick, pack, and ship product out of the facility.
 Tracking where products are stocked, which suppliers they come from, and the length of time they are stored.  By analyzing such data, companies can control inventory levels and maximize the use of warehouse space. Furthermore, firms are more prepared for the demands and supplies of the market, especially during special circumstances such as a peak season on a particular month. Through the reports generated by an AS/RS system, firms are also able to gather important data that may be put in a model for it to be analyzed.

Vertical lift module 
Vertical lift modules (VLMs) can be built to a height to match the available overhead space in a facility. Multiple units can be placed in 'pods' whereby an operator can retrieve items from one unit while the other units are moving. Variants include width, height, load, speed and a control system.

The VLM is a board controlled automated vertical lift module. Inventory within the VLM is stored on front and rear tray locations or rails. When a tray is requested, either by entering a tray number in the built-in control pad or by requesting a part through software, an extractor travels vertically between the two columns of trays and pulls the requested tray from its location and brings it to an access point. The operator then picks or replenishes stock and the tray is returned to its home upon confirmation.

VLM systems are sold in numerous configurations, which could be applied in different industries, logistics, as well as office settings.  The VLM systems could be customized to fully utilize the height of the facility, even through multiple floors. With the capability of multiple access openings on different floors, a VLM system is able to provide an innovative storage and retrieval solution. The rapid movement of the extractor, as well as inventory management software, can dramatically increase the efficiency of the picking process.  This occurs by simultaneously retrieving and storing trays in multiple units. Unlike large AS/RS systems, which require a complete overhaul of the warehouse or production line, the vertical lift modules are modularized, which can be easily integrated into the existing system, or to be rolled out in gradually over different phases.

Most common applications include: MRO, order picking, consolidation, kitting, parts handling, buffering, inventory storage, WIP, buffer storage, and many more.

VLMs provide floor space savings, increased labor productivity and picking accuracy, improved worker ergonomics, and controlled process.

Most VLMs offer dynamic space storage which measures the tray every time it is returned to the unit to optimize space, safety features and some offer tilt tray delivery for increased ergonomic accessibility, and laser pointers which indicate the exact item to be picked on each tray.

Horizontal carousels 

A horizontal carousel is a series of bins which revolve on an oval track. An operator simply inputs a bin number, part number or cell location and the carousel will rotate via the shortest path. Multiple horizontal carousels integrated with pick to light technology and inventory management software (a pod of carousels) are used for order fulfillment.

A wave of orders are sent to the pod. A group of orders are selected to create a batch. The operator simply follows the lights and pick round-robin from the carousels and place items in a batch station behind them. Each carousel pre-positions and rotates when picked. By applying the "product to person" principle, operators do not have to move from their position to prepare the order.

When the batch is complete, a new batch is inducted and the process repeated until the wave is complete. Horizontal carousels can save up to 75% of floorspace, increase productivity by 2/3, accuracy levels to 99.9%+ levels and throughput up to 750 lines per hour/operator.

Horizontal carousel systems generally outperform robotic systems for a fraction of the cost. Horizontal carousels are the most cost-effective AS/RS system available.

Robotic Inserter/Extractor devices can also be used for horizontal carousels. The robotic device is positioned in the front or rear of up to three horizontal carousels tiered high. The robot grabs the tote required in the order and often replenishes at the same time to speed up throughput. The tote(s) are then delivered to a conveyor which routes it to a work station for picking or replenishing. Up to eight transactions per minute per unit can be done. Totes or containers up to 36" x 36" x 36" can be used in a system.

On a simplistic level, horizontal carousels are also often used as "rotating shelving." 'With simple "fetch" command, items are brought to the operator and otherwise wasted space is eliminated.

AS/RS Applications: Most applications of AS/RS technology have been associated with warehousing and distribution operations. An AS/RS can also be used to store raw materials and work in process in manufacturing. Three application areas can be distinguished for AS/RS: (1) Unit load storage and handling, (2) Order picking, and (3) Work in process storage. Unit load storage and retrieval applications are represented by unit load AS/RS and deep-lane storage systems. These kinds of applications are commonly found in warehousing for finishing goods in a distribution center, rarely in manufacturing. Deep-lane systems are used in the food industry. As described above, order picking involves retrieving materials in less than full unit load quantities. Minilpass, man-on board, and items retrieval systems are used for this second application area.

Work in process storage is a more recent application of automated storage technology. While it is desirable to minimize the amount of work in process, WIP is unavoidable and must be effectively managed. Automated storage systems, either automated storage/retrieval systems or carousel systems, represent an efficient way to store materials between processing steps, particularly in batch and job shop production. In high production, work in process is often carried between operations by conveyor system, which this serve both storage and transport functions.

Installed applications
Installed applications of this technology can be wide-ranging.  In some libraries, such as at University of Nevada, Reno library, such a system is employed to retrieve books. Still others in use involve retrieval of bicycles from a bicycle tree, as in the case of systems in Japan.

Institutions using automated storage and retrieval systems
Some examples of academic institutions using automated storage and retrieval systems are;

University of British Columbia, Vancouver, British Columbia
California State University, Long Beach, Long Beach, California
California State University, Northridge, Northridge, California
University of Central Florida, Orlando, Florida
Chicago State University, Chicago, Illinois
University of Chicago, Chicago, Illinois
Colgate University, Hamilton, New York
Cornell University, Ithaca, New York
Defense Visual Information Center, March Air Reserve Base, Riverside County, California
Eastern Michigan University, Ypsilanti, Michigan
Georgia Southern University, Statesboro, Georgia
Grand Valley State University, Grand Rapids, Michigan
Liberty University, Lynchburg, Virginia
University of Limerick, Limerick (Ireland)
University of Louisville, Louisville, Kentucky
Macquarie University, Sydney, Australia
Marywood University, Scranton, Pennsylvania
University of Missouri–Kansas City, Kansas City, Missouri
University of Nevada, Las Vegas
University of Nevada, Reno
UTS Library, University of Technology Sydney
North Carolina State University, Raleigh, North Carolina
Santa Clara University, Santa Clara, California 
Sonoma State University, Rohnert Park, California
Tri-County Technical College, Pendleton, South Carolina
University of Utah, Salt Lake City, Utah
Utah State University, Logan, Utah
Christopher Center, Valparaiso University, Valparaiso, Indiana
Waseda University, Tokyo (Japan)

Types 

 Vertical Lift Storage Modules (VLSM) - These are also called vertical lift automated storage/retrieval systems. All of the next AS/RS types are designed around a horizontal aisle. The same principle of using a center aisle to access loads is used, except that the aisle is vertical. Vertical lift storage modules, some with heights of 10 meters or more, are capable of holding large inventories while saving valuable floor space in the factory.
 Unit load stackers - The unit load stackers is typically a large automated system designed to handle unit loads stored on pallets or in other standard containers. The system is computer controlled, and the S/R machines are automated and designed to handle the unit load containers.
 ASRS Gantry Robots - These are a type of Automated Storage/Retrieval Systems used in warehousing and logistics sectors. Some common uses for these are in the Tire Industry for stacking tire inventory. Most of these systems span 50–60 ft in width and average 200–300 feet in length. These systems use End Effectors a.k.a. End of Arm Tooling to pick and place the tire stacks from conveyors.

Man-aboard systems 
A man-aboard system can provide significant floorspace savings over manual or forklift operations but is not truly an AS/RS, as the operation is still manual. Storage system heights are not limited by the reach height of the order picker, as the picker rides along on the platform as it is moved vertically or horizontally to the various storage locations. Shelves or storage cabinets can be stacked as high as floor loading, weight capacity, throughput requirements, and/or ceiling heights will permit. Man-aboard storage and retrieval systems are far and away the most expensive picker-to-stock equipment alternative but are less expensive than a fully automated system. Aisle-captive storage/retrieval machines reaching heights up to 40 feet cost around $125,000. Hence, there must be enough storage density and/or productivity improvement over cart and tote picking to justify the investment. Also, because vertical travel is slow compared to horizontal travel, typical picking rates in man-aboard operations range between 40 and 250 lines per person-hour. The range is large because there is a wide variety of operating schemes for man-aboard systems. Man-aboard systems are typically appropriate for slow-moving items where space is fairly expensive.

See also 
 Actionable information logistics
 Autonomous logistics
 Inventory management software
 Voice-directed warehousing
 Warehouse
 Automated guided vehicle

References

Further reading 
 Frazelle, E. (2001), World-class Warehousing and Material Handling, McGraw-Hill, New York, NY.

External links 
 

Library automation
Warehouses